Wheelchair fencing at the 1968 Summer Paralympics consisted of ten events, seven for men and three for women.

Medal summary

Men's events

Women's events

References 

 

1968 Summer Paralympics events
1968
Paralympics
Fencing competitions in Israel
International sports competitions hosted by Israel
1968 in Israeli sport